Emarginula octaviana is a species of sea snail, a marine gastropod mollusk in the family Fissurellidae, the keyhole limpets.

Description
The size of the white shell varies between 7 mm and 15 mm. The shell has an oval-elongate contour and moderately elevated profile. The apex is close to the posterior margin, moderately coiled and not overhanging. The sculpture of the shell shows high, strong radial costae, some smaller radial costae intercalated on the sides, and comarginal lamellae forming a very coarse lattice with the costae. The slit in the shell is broad and rectangular, extending over 1/5 of the distance to apex.

Distribution
This species occurs in the Mediterranean Sea and in the Atlantic Ocean off the Canary Islands, the Azores and from Southern Spain to Morocco.

References

 Coen G. (1939). «Emarginulae» nuove del Mediterraneo. Acta Pontifica Academia Scientiarum 3(10): 69–72, 1 pl. 
 Piani P. (1985). Revisione del genere Emarginula Lamarck, 1801 in Mediterraneo. Lavori, Società Italiana di Malacologia 21: 193–238 
 Gofas, S.; Le Renard, J.; Bouchet, P. (2001). Mollusca, in: Costello, M.J. et al. (Ed.) (2001). European register of marine species: a check-list of the marine species in Europe and a bibliography of guides to their identification. Collection Patrimoines Naturels, 50: pp. 180–213
 Ardovini, R.; Cossignani, T. (2004). West African seashells (including Azores, Madeira and Canary Is.) = Conchiglie dell'Africa Occidentale (includes Azzorre, Madeira e Canarie). English-Italian edition. L'Informatore Piceno: Ancona, Italy. . 319 pp. page(s): 19

Fissurellidae
Gastropods described in 1939